General Barnes may refer to:

Edward Barnes (British Army officer) (1776–1838), British Army lieutenant general
Gladeon M. Barnes (1887–1961), U.S. Army major general
James Barnes (general) (1801–1869), Union Army brigadier general and brevet major general
Joseph Barnes (American physician) (1817–1883), Union Army brigadier general and brevet major general, 12th Surgeon General of the United States Army
Reginald Barnes (1871–1946), British Army major general

See also
Alfred Smith Barnes (1817–1888), American publisher and philanthropist known as "the General"
Attorney General Barnes (disambiguation)